Agendum is a fictional topical news show and current affairs parody by Joel Morris and Jason Hazeley. The first series was broadcast on BBC Radio 4 in August 2018, and within half an hour of airing had been recommissioned for a second series, which was broadcast in February 2019. Both series were produced by Pozzitive Television.

Episode list

Critical Reception 

Agendum was received positively in The Guardian, with Miranda Sawyer writing that "it really made me laugh", and independent blogger The Cambridge Geek also praised the show, writing "this is a bloody funny programme". In 2019, Agendum was shortlisted for the BBC's Audio Drama Awards for 'Best Scripted Comedy (Sketch Show)'. In 2020, Agendum was nominated for a Rose D'Or Award

References 

BBC Radio 4 programmes